Academia de Futebol Pérolas Negras, known as Pérolas Negras, is a Brazilian football club based in Resende, Rio de Janeiro state. Founded in 2009, the club plays in the Campeonato Carioca Série B2.

History
Founded in 2009 in Haiti by non-governmental organization Viva Rio as a peace mission, the club expanded to Brazil in 2014. They played amateur tournaments until joining the Federação de Futebol do Estado do Rio de Janeiro and winning the 2017 Campeonato Carioca Série C.

Pérolas won finished fourth and third in the 2018 and 2019 editions of the Campeonato Carioca Série B2, respectively, missing out promotion in both occasions. In 2020, the club won the tournament, but remained in a third tier (now called Campeonato Carioca Série B1) after a change in the league structure.

In November 2021, Pérolas Negras won the year's Copa Rio, winning a spot in the 2022 Campeonato Brasileiro Série D.

Honours
Copa Rio: 2021
Campeonato Carioca Série B2: 2020
Campeonato Carioca Série C: 2017

References

External links
 

Association football clubs established in 2009
Football clubs in Rio de Janeiro (state)
2009 establishments in Brazil